Good, Good, Twistin' is a compilation album by American musician James Brown and The Famous Flames. It consists of tracks from his first four studio albums, in addition to his recent single "Shout and Shimmy" and the previously unreleased "Have Mercy Baby". The album was released in 1962, by King Records. The album was later reissued under the title Shout and Shimmy. While some songs feature the original Flames, the longest lasting Flames lineup (Bobby Byrd,  Bobby Bennett, and Lloyd Stallworth) are featured on four songs:  "Shout and Shimmy", (and its B-side "Come Over Here" ), "Good, Good, Lovin'", and "I Don't Mind".

Track listing

References

1962 albums
James Brown albums
The Famous Flames albums
King Records (United States) albums